Qingzhou is a county-level city in Shandong, China.

Qingzhou may also refer to:

Qingzhou Bridge, a bridge over the Min River in Fuzhou, Fujian, China

Towns and townships
Qingzhou, Fujian, a town in Shaxian District, Sanming, Fujian, China
Qingzhou, Guangdong, a town in Heping County, Guangdong, China
Qingzhou, Hebei, a town in Qing County, Hebei, China
Qingzhou Township, a township in Jiajiang County, Sichuan, China

Historical locations
Qing Province (青州), one of the Nine Provinces in ancient China
Qīng Prefecture (青州), a prefecture in modern Shandong, China between the 6th and 11th centuries, named after the ancient province
Qìng Prefecture (慶州), a prefecture in modern Gansu, China between the 6th and 11th centuries

See also
Ching Chau (disambiguation) — Cantonese equivalent
Qing (disambiguation)
Cheongju, a city in North Chungcheong, South Korea, known as "Qingzhou" in Chinese
Gyeongju, a city in North Gyeongsang, South Korea, also known as "Qingzhou" in Chinese